Boulding Ridge is the ridge separating Todd Glacier and McClary Glacier on the west side of Graham Land. It was named by the UK Antarctic Place-Names Committee for Richard A. Boulding, British Antarctic Survey surveyor at Stonington Island, 1965–68.

References
 

Ridges of Graham Land
Fallières Coast